The Deputy President of the State Presidium of Kampuchea was deputy head of state of Democratic Kampuchea from 1976 to 1978.

List of deputy presidents

See also
Vice President of the State Council of Cambodia

References

Lists of political office-holders in Cambodia
Kampuchea
Democratic Kampuchea